In mathematics,  the Mittag-Leffler function  is a special function, a complex function which depends on two complex parameters  and .

where  is the gamma function.
For , the series above equals the Taylor expansion of the geometric series and consequently .

This function is named after Gösta Mittag-Leffler. This class of functions are important in the theory of the fractional calculus.

For , the Mittag-Leffler function  is an entire function of order , and is in some sense the simplest entire function of its order.

The Mittag-Leffler function satisfies the recurrence property (Theorem 5.1 of )

from which the Poincaré asymptotic expansion

Special cases
For  we find: (Section 2 of )

Error function:

The sum of a geometric progression:

Exponential function:

Hyperbolic cosine:

For , we have

For , the integral

Mittag-Leffler's integral representation
The integral representation of the Mittag-Leffler function is (Section 6 of )

Applications of Mittag-Leffler function
One of the applications of the Mittag-Leffler function is in modeling fractional order viscoelastic materials. Experimental investigations into the time-dependent relaxation behavior of viscoelastic materials are characterized by a very fast decrease of the stress at the beginning of the relaxation process and an extremely slow decay for large times. It can even take a long time before a constant asymptotic value is reached. Therefore, a lot of Maxwell elements are required to describe relaxation behavior with sufficient accuracy. This ends in a difficult optimization problem in order to identify a large number of material parameters. On the other hand, over the years, the concept of fractional derivatives has been introduced to the theory of viscoelasticity. Among these models, the fractional Zener model was found to be very effective to predict the dynamic nature of rubber-like materials with only a small number of material parameters. The solution of the corresponding constitutive equation leads to a relaxation function of the Mittag-Leffler type. It is defined by the power series with negative arguments. This function represents all essential properties of the relaxation process under the influence of an arbitrary and continuous signal with a jump at the origin.

See also
 Mittag-Leffler summation
 Mittag-Leffler distribution
 Fox–Wright function

Notes 
 R Package 'MittagLeffleR'  by Gurtek Gill, Peter Straka. Implements the Mittag-Leffler function, distribution, random variate generation, and estimation.

References

 Mittag-Leffler, M.G.: Sur la nouvelle fonction E(x). C. R. Acad. Sci. Paris 137, 554–558 (1903)
 Mittag-Leffler, M.G.: Sopra la funzione E˛.x/. Rend. R. Acc. Lincei, (Ser. 5) 13, 3–5 (1904)
 Gorenflo R., Kilbas A.A., Mainardi F., Rogosin S.V., Mittag-Leffler Functions, Related Topics and Applications (Springer, New York, 2014) 443 pages

External links 
 Mittag-Leffler function: MATLAB code
 Mittag-Leffler and stable random numbers: Continuous-time random walks and stochastic solution of space-time fractional diffusion equations

Special functions
Analytic functions